The 1994 Virginia Cavaliers football team represented the University of Virginia during the 1994 NCAA Division I-A football season. The team's head coach was George Welsh. They played their home games at Scott Stadium in Charlottesville, Virginia.

Schedule

Roster

References

Virginia
Virginia Cavaliers football seasons
Independence Bowl champion seasons
Virginia Cavaliers football